This is a list of State Protected Monument in India as officially reported by and available through the website of the Archaeological Survey of India in the  state Telangana, India. The monument identifier is a combination of the abbreviation of the subdivision of the list (state, ASI circle) and the numbering as published on the website of the ASI. 500 State Protected Monuments have been recognized by the ASI in Telangana. Besides the State Protected Monuments, also the Monuments of National Importance in this state might be relevant.

The below tables lists the monuments based on alphabetical order of their respective districts.

Adilabad

 

|}

Hyderabad

|}

K

|}

M

 

|}

N

	

 
|}

R 

 
|}

W

|}

References

External links
AP Archaeology Museum

T
State Protected Monuments
History of Telangana
Monuments and memorials in Telangana
Lists of tourist attractions in Telangana